Santiago Tangamandapio, known as Tangamandapio, is a municipality located in the northwest part of the Mexican state of Michoacán, WSW of Zamora, Michoacán, 165 km from the state capital of Morelia. The geographic coordinates are: 19° 57' North latitude and 102° 26' West longitude. The original name is Santiago Tangamandapio. Tangamandapio Municipality also includes the community of Tarécuato.

Popular culture
The municipality gained notoriety due to the Mexican television series El Chavo del Ocho (1973–80), in which the character Jaimito, el Cartero (portrayed by Raúl Padilla) cites Tangamandapio as his birthplace. In commemoration, the municipal government erected a statue of the character in 2012.

Geography

Climate
Tangamandapio has a monsoon-influenced humid subtropical climate (Cwa, according to the Köppen climate classification), with humid summers and dry winters.

References

External links
Government of Michoacan site
History and images of this town

Municipalities of Michoacán